Davoud Abedinzadeh Chadorchi (born August 29, 1986 in Tehran) is an Iranian wrestler.

Education
Abedinzadeh has bachelor's degree in Physical Education from Azad Islamic University.

References
 

1986 births
Living people
Asian Games silver medalists for Iran
Asian Games medalists in wrestling
Wrestlers at the 2006 Asian Games
Iranian male sport wrestlers
Medalists at the 2006 Asian Games
21st-century Iranian people